Hypertrichosis simplex of the scalp is a cutaneous condition caused by defects in the corneodesmosin protein.

See also 
 Hairy elbow syndrome
 List of cutaneous conditions
 List of conditions caused by problems with junctional proteins

References 

Conditions of the skin appendages